The Moroccan American League is a Moroccan cultural association in America.

See also
 Moroccan American Chamber of Commerce

References

Diaspora organizations in the United States
Moroccan-American history